La Vingtaine des Marais (Jèrriais: Vîngtaine des Mathais) is one of the four vingtaines of the Parish of Grouville in the Channel Island of Jersey.

See also
Vingtaine de la Rue
Vingtaine de Longueville
Vingtaine de la Rocque

References

Marais
Grouville